Samardžić is a Yugoslavian surname, an occupational surname derived from samardžija, a Turkism meaning "saddle maker". Samardžić is also found in Bosanska Krajina (Cazin) by Bosniaks. It may refer to:
Ayline Samardžić (born 2002) Swiss tennis player
Aleksandra Samardžić (born 1997), Bosnian judoka
Esad Samardžić (born 1958), Bosnian music manager
Dejan Samardzic, member of Haujobb
Lazar Samardžić (born 2002), German-Serbian footballer
Ljubiša Samardžić (1936-2017), Serbian actor and director
Jasmin Samardžić (born 1974), Croatian footballer 
Marko Samardžić (born 1983), Serbian volleyball player
Matea Samardžić (born 1995), Croatian swimmer
Miral Samardžić (born 1987), Slovenian footballer
Miloslav Samardžić (born 1963), Serbian writer
Radomir Samardžić (born 1978), Serbian taekwondo athlete
Radoslav Samardžić (born 1970), retired Serbian footballer
Radovan Samardžić (1922-1994), Serbian historian
Slobodan Samardžić (born 1953), Serbian academic and politician
Snežana Samardžić-Marković (born 1966), Serbian politician
Spasoje "Paja" Samardžić (born 1942), retired Serbian footballer
Tin Samardžić (born 1979), Croatian pop singer
Željko Samardžić (born 1955), Herzegovinian-Serbian singer

Bosnian surnames
Occupational surnames
Montenegrin surnames